The 2016 Conference USA Championship Game was played on Saturday, December 3, 2016, at Houchens Industries–L. T. Smith Stadium in Bowling Green, Kentucky, and determined the 2016 football champion of Conference USA (C-USA). The game featured the West Division champion Louisiana Tech visiting the East Division champion Western Kentucky Hilltoppers (WKU), with the Hilltoppers winning 58–44. The game was broadcast nationally by ESPN for the 5th consecutive year. The title sponsor was Dynacraft BSC.

If winner of the C-USA Championship Game is one of highest ranked in the rankings of the "Group of Five" conferences, the team could be placed in the playoffs if not then the Cotton Bowl. The conference champion if not selected would then pick a bowl game of their choosing to attend that has ties to the conference.

The 2016 championship game was the 12th game in the championship series. In the 2015 championship game, also hosted by WKU, the Hilltoppers defeated Southern Miss, 45–28.

The game proved to be the last for Jeff Brohm as WKU's head coach; two days later, he was hired to fill the head coaching vacancy at Purdue.

Teams

Louisiana Tech

The Bulldogs got off to a rough start at 1-2 before going into conference play with a close 21–20 loss to Arkansas. Louisiana Tech lost its first conference game against Middle Tennessee in which the Bulldogs lost the game in the last quarter when the Blue Raiders scored 21 points to win 38–34. The Bulldogs then went undefeated in conference play before losing their regular-season finale 39–24 to Southern Miss on November 26. They had already clinched the West Division title on November 12 by defeating UTSA, winning the division title for the second time in school history. The previous time the Bulldogs won the West Division was back in 2014, which resulted in the Bulldogs losing by 3 points to Marshall.

Western Kentucky

WKU opened the season with a conference win over Rice, and then went 2–2 in its nonconference schedule, with both losses to Southeastern Conference teams. WKU then resumed its conference schedule at Louisiana Tech, losing 55–52, before winning its final six regular-season games, finishing C-USA play as East Division co-champions along with Old Dominion. Both teams finished 7–1 in C-USA play, with WKU holding the tiebreaker with a 59–24 win over Old Dominion on October 22. Entering the final weekend of conference play, the Hilltoppers could have been beaten out for hosting rights by Louisiana Tech, which entered that weekend 6–1 in the conference and held the head-to-head tiebreaker with its win over WKU. However, the Bulldogs lost on November 26 to Southern Miss, leaving them at 6–2 in C-USA play. WKU hosted the championship for the second consecutive season, making it the first C-USA school to ever do so.

Game summary
WKU hosted the Bulldogs of Louisiana Tech at Houchens Industries–L. T. Smith Stadium in Bowling Green, Kentucky at noon Eastern Time on December 3, 2016 and was broadcast on ESPN. Louisiana Tech held the overall series record over the Hilltoppers 4–2 before the matchup. The Bulldogs defeated the Hilltoppers in the last meeting back in the beginning of the season on October 6, 55–52.

Scoring summary

Source:

Statistics

References

Championship
Conference USA Football Championship Game
Louisiana Tech Bulldogs football games
Western Kentucky Hilltoppers football games
December 2016 sports events in the United States
Conference USA